The IWRG Intercontinental Super Welterweight Championship (Campeonato Intercontinental de Peso Super Welter IWRG in Spanish) is an inactive professional wrestling championship promoted by the Mexican professional wrestling promotion International Wrestling Revolution Group (IWRG).

As it was a professional wrestling championship, the championship was not won not by actual competition, but by a scripted ending to a match determined by the bookers and match makers. On occasion the promotion declares a championship vacant, which means there is no champion at that point in time. This can either be due to a storyline, or real life issues such as a champion suffering an injury being unable to defend the championship, or leaving the company.

The first and so far only champion is Místico, who was under contract with Consejo Mundial de Lucha Libre (CMLL) at the time, but worked for IWRG under a talent sharing agreement between the two companies. The talent sharing agreement ended in 2008, but the Super Welterweight Championship has not officially been declared vacant even. It is considered inactive as the IWRG simply does not promote it or refer to it any more.

Title history

Footnotes

References

External links
IWRG Intercontinental Super Welterweight Title history:
wrestling-titles.com
solie.org

International Wrestling Revolution Group championships
Super welterweight wrestling championships
Intercontinental professional wrestling championships